United Methodist Church may refer to:

Denominations
 United Methodist Church in the United States
 United Methodist Church (Great Britain), which merged with other British Methodist denominations in 1932

Individual churches

 First United Methodist Church (Jasper, Florida), listed on the National Register of Historic Places (NRHP)
 United Methodist Church of Batavia, Batavia, Illinois, NRHP-listed
 United Methodist Church (Washington, New Jersey), NRHP-listed, also known as First Methodist Episcopal Church
 United Methodist Church (Chaumont, New York), NRHP-listed 
 United Methodist Church of the Highlands, Highland Falls, New York; formerly First Presbyterian Church of Highland Falls
 United Methodist Church (Morristown, New York), NRHP-listed
 United Methodist Church and Parsonage (Mount Kisco, New York), NRHP-listed
 United Methodist Church (Patchogue, New York), NRHP-listed
 Walden United Methodist Church, Walden, New York, NRHP-listed
 United Methodist Church (Waterloo, New York), NRHP-listed
 Armstrong Chapel United Methodist Church, Indian Hill, Ohio; also known as United Methodist Church
 United Methodist Church (Mechanicsburg, Ohio), NRHP-listed
 United Methodist Church (Millersburg, Ohio), NRHP-listed

See also

 
 
List of Methodist churches
 First United Methodist Church (disambiguation)
 The Methodist Church (disambiguation)

United Methodist Church